Gary Devore is an archaeologist and author currently affiliated with Stanford University.

He is a director and principal investigator of the Binchester Project excavating the Binchester Roman Fort in the UK.

He is a former director of the Pompeii Archaeological Research Project: Porta Stabia (PARP:PS) that excavated in Pompeii from 2005-2009.

Works
Apart from his archaeological work, Devore has written an expansive novel called Pantheon that tells the story of the ancient Greek and Roman gods reclaiming their worship in the modern world.  It is a Humanistic work that critiques many aspects of organized religion.

Devore is also the author of a guidebook to Rome targeted toward "tourists and scholars who are interested in exploring first-hand the grandeur and magnificence that was ancient Rome through a Humanist, secular, and freethinking lens."  It is called Walking Tours of Ancient Rome: A Secular Guidebook to the Eternal City.

References

American archaeologists
1970 births
Living people